Kurichi is a village in the Vazhapadi taluk of Salem district, in Tamil Nadu, India.

Geography
Kurichi is within Vazhapadi taluk, which is in the central part of Salem district. Kurichi is within the drainage basin of the Vellar River, and the Anaimuduvu River, a tributary of the Vellar, flows past the village during the wet season.

Demographics
In 2011 Kurichi had a population of 8,043 people living in 2,120 households. 4,091 (50.9%) of the inhabitants were male, while 3,952 (49.1%) were female. 841 children in the town, about 10.5% of the population, were at or below the age of 6. The literacy rate in the town was 62.7%. Scheduled Castes and Scheduled Tribes accounted for about 11% and 0.3% of the population, respectively.

References

Villages in Salem district
Villages in Vazhapadi taluk